Theodore Lawrence Strickland (September 17, 1932 – March 14, 2012) was an American politician who served as the 39th Lieutenant Governor of Colorado from 1973 to 1975 under Governor John D. Vanderhoof. Strickland served in both houses of the Colorado General Assembly and was President of the Colorado Senate.

References

1932 births
2012 deaths
Lieutenant Governors of Colorado
Republican Party members of the Colorado House of Representatives
People from Adams County, Colorado
People from Austin, Texas
Presidents of the Colorado State Senate
Republican Party Colorado state senators